Rancho Dolores is a village in Belize District, Belize about 45 miles from Belize City.

Its precise geographic location is 17.53 latitude and -88.62 longitude. It is the last village on the road leading down the Belize River Valley. 

Rancho Dolores was probably founded in the late eighteenth century, presumably by a rancher named Dolores, although this is no longer known. The people were originally Maya, but today are mostly Creole peoples. The important feature of the settlement is the proximity to Spanish Creek wildlife sanctuary, an important fauna and flora reserve. The nearby river has highly visible crocodiles, turtles and there are still jaguars in the nearby forest.

Part of the interest of Rancho Dolores is the way Creole life has been preserved, in contrast to the other villages, where is it largely moribund. Cooking is still done on the traditional firehearth, using the kiskis, a type of tongs made from the cohune palm. Every May, there are dances for Holy Week, including the hogshead dance and the plantation dance.

References

 

Populated places in Belize District
Belize Rural North